Prune juice is a fruit juice derived from prunes (dried plums) that have been rehydrated. It is a mass-produced product that is often produced using a hot extraction method, and juice concentrate is typically produced using a low-temperature extraction method. It may be used as a dietary supplement to act as a laxative. It is also sometimes used as a flavor enhancer in tobacco products. It is an ingredient in many cocktails, such as the Purple Dragon, or Constipolitan.

Composition 
Prune juice is 81% water, 17% carbohydrates, 0.6% protein, and contains negligible fat. 

In the United States, bottled or canned prune juice contains "not less than 18.5% by the weight of water-soluble solids extracted from dried plums".

Nutrition

Phytochemicals 
Prune juice and plums contain phytochemicals, including phenolic compounds (mainly as neochlorogenic acids and chlorogenic acids) and sorbitol.

Production 
Prune juice is often produced using hot extraction methods, whereby the prunes are cooked in hot water, becoming a liquid extract, which is then processed into juice. The process of heating and extraction may occur several times with the same batch of prunes, with the collective extracts from each processing then mixed together to create the final product. Prune juice is a mass-produced product.

Prune juice is also produced as a concentrate, whereby low temperature water is used to create a liquid extract. The concentrate has a high sugar content, and is used by food processors to enhance the flavor of and sweeten products, as a humectant to retain moisture in cookies and cakes, and as an ingredient in cereal bars to bind the ingredients.

As a dietary supplement 
Prunes may provide a natural laxative effect, and prune juice may serve as a natural laxative for cases of mild constipation. In 1990, the U.S. Food and Drug Administration stated that "the common prune is an effective laxative".

History

United States 
Duffy-Mott began producing prune juice in 1933, which was purveyed under the Sunsweet brand name.

The commercial distribution of prune juice in the United States first occurred in 1934, which "began with an output of only 40,000 cases".

Other uses 
Prune juice concentrate, prune extracts and plum extracts are sometimes used as an additive in tobacco products to enhance flavor.

Toilet water 
In central Pennsylvania during the early days of prohibition in the United States, some bootleggers sold a dangerous concoction facetiously referred to as whiskey, which was also called "toilet water", that consisted of various colognes, perfumes and prune juice mixed together.

In popular culture 
In the Star Trek episode "Yesterday's Enterprise", the Klingon character Worf is introduced to prune juice by Guinan.  He declares that it is a "warrior's drink" and begins to drink it regularly in subsequent episodes, even carrying the habit over to Star Trek: Deep Space Nine.

In the series Suits, the character Louis Litt (played by Rick Hoffman) drinks prune juice.

Gallery

See also 

 Chocolate-covered prune
 Juicing
 List of juices
 List of plum dishes
 List of additives in cigarettes
 Suanmeitang – (sour prune drink), a traditional Chinese beverage made from smoked plums, rock sugar, and other ingredients

References

Further reading 
 

Fruit juice
Plum dishes